Gü is a dessert manufacturing company, whose products are sold in the United Kingdom, Austria, Germany, the Netherlands, France, Australia, New Zealand, Italy and the United States. The product is made in the UK and was created by James Averdieck.

Overview

Launch 
Gü launched in 2003 with three products: two chocolate mousses and a chocolate soufflé in glass ramekins, developed through a joint venture with a patisserie company in London. The venture had a seed capital of £65,000.

Gü diversified into fruity puddings with a new brand called Frü in 2005, but merged this with the Gü brand in May 2010. In 2007 Gü launched 24 new products.

In 2010, Averdieck collected approximately £9 million after selling Gü to Noble Foods for £32.5 million.

Products 
The company's products include ramekin, sharing puds, mini puds and mousses. Various styles are produced, including cheesecakes, puddings and tortes, in various flavours.

Awards
Gü received a Design Week Award.

See also

 List of desserts

References 

Food manufacturers of the United Kingdom
British desserts